The Elliott School of International Affairs (known as the Elliott School or ESIA) is the professional school of international relations, foreign policy, and international development of the George Washington University, in Washington, D.C. It is highly ranked in international affairs and is the largest school of international relations in the United States.

The Elliott School is located across from the U.S. State Department and the Organization of American States, and closely to the White House, the World Bank, and the International Monetary Fund. The Carnegie Corporation of New York ranks the Elliott School as one of the world's foremost, leading research institutions in the fields of public and foreign policy, hosting numerous research centers, institutes, and policy programs, such as the Institute for International Economic Policy and The Project on Forward Engagement.

Elliott School alumni and faculty have included ambassadors, diplomats, politicians, and public figures, including heads of state and government, U.S. senators, prominent politicians, NATO officials, U.N. ambassadors, and foreign ministers. Since January 2021, Alyssa Ayres has served as dean, the first woman to hold the post.

History

The Elliott School traces its roots to 1898 when the George Washington University first offered studies in international affairs within the School of Comparative Jurisprudence and Diplomacy.

In 1905, the school was replaced with the Department of Politics and Diplomacy, which ran from 1905 to 1907. This department was expanded to include other fields of study and reconstituted as the College of the Political Sciences, a part of the university that operated from 1907 till 1913. At this point, the college was turned into an academic department within the Columbian College and renamed the Department of International Law and Diplomacy. This iteration of the Elliott School functioned from  1913 until 1928.

In 1928, the university once again reorganized its departments. It was in this year that the School of Government was created. This school had the longest run until then, as it remained a part of the university from 1928 till 1960. It was in 1960 that the fields of business and international affairs were added to the school of government, creating thus the School of Government, Business, and International Affairs, working from 1960 until 1966. Then, in 1966, President Lloyd Hartman Elliott split its faculties into a new School of Government and Business Administration (SGBA) and a new School of Public and International Affairs. Running from 1966 until 1987, it was once again renamed and became the School of International Affairs. It was then in 1988 when, in honor of President Elliott and his wife Evelyn, that the school acquired its present name and became the Elliott School of International affairs. At this point it was reorganized to focus exclusively on undergraduate, graduate, and mid-career education in international affairs.

In March 2003, the Elliott School opened its new academic building at 1957 E Street NW. The building was formally opened by then-Secretary of State and GW Alumnus Colin Powell. This building features state-of-the-art lecture halls, classrooms, offices, lounges, and common areas used to host public events. It is diagonally across from the Harry S Truman Building, the headquarters of the United States Department of State through a small park. The school is just east of the headquarters of the American Red Cross and across the road from the United States Office of Personnel Management.

Dr. Michael E. Brown served as Dean of the Elliott School, from 2005 to 2015, having previously served as Director of the Georgetown University Center for Peace and Security Studies and Associate Director of the Belfer Center for Science and International Affairs at Harvard University. From 2015 to 2020, the Dean of the Elliott School was Ambassador Reuben E. Brigety II, former U.S. Ambassador to the African Union and Deputy Assistant Secretary of State for African Affairs.

Academics

Undergraduate programs
The Elliott School offers undergraduate degrees either as a Bachelor of Arts (B.A.) or Bachelor of Science (B.S.) in the following programs:
Bachelor of International Affairs
Bachelor of Asian Studies
Bachelor of Middle Eastern Studies
Bachelor of Latin American and Hemispheric Studies

The International Affairs major is further broken down by regional and functional concentrations. Functional concentrations include Security Policy, International Politics, Global Public Health, Conflict Resolution, Comparative Political, Economic & Social Systems, Contemporary Cultures & Societies, International Development Studies, International Economics, and International Environmental Resources. Regional concentrations include Africa, Asia, Europe & Eurasia, Latin America, and the Middle East.

Graduate programs
The School offers Master of Arts degrees in a variety of fields. There are two main categories of fields of study:
 Functional studies degrees:
 Master of Global Communications
 Master of International Affairs
 Master of International Development Studies
 Master of International Science & Technology Policy
 Master of Security Policy Studies
 Master of International Economic Policy
 Regional studies degrees:
 Master of Asian Studies
 Master of European & Eurasian Studies
 Master of Latin American & Hemispheric Studies
 Master of Middle East Studies

There are also two special programs besides the Master of Arts. One is for mid-career professionals, called a Master of International Policy and Practice (MIPP), while the other is a Master of International Studies (MIS) granted to graduate students attending Elliott School academic partner institutions abroad.

Joint and dual degrees

There are also three joint and dual-degrees programs. The Elliott School and the School of Business offer a Master of Arts and Master of Business Administration program, while it partners with the Law School to grant a Master of Arts and Juris Doctor. The third program is a Master of Arts and Master of Public Health, in partnership with George Washington's School of Public Health and Health Services.

Certificates
Global Gender Policy
International Science and Technology Policy
Nuclear Policy Studies

International studies
The school runs an independent study abroad program for its graduate students. As a part of its internationally focused education, it encourages graduate students to add an international component to their studies by living in a foreign country. The school believes that the experience is a key part of an education in international affairs because it increases understanding of the world by providing students with a variety of new and unexpected perspectives. The program functions as bilateral partnerships with a number of schools.

The undergraduate students also have the option of studying abroad during their time at the Elliott School. However, the undergraduate program utilizes GW's university-wide study abroad system. Thanks to that, these students have access to nearly 250 study abroad programs.

Reputation and rankings

Foreign Policy ranks the Elliott School as being the 8th in the Top U.S. Undergraduate Institutions to Study International Relations 2018.

Foreign Policy ranks the Elliott School's Master in International Affairs as the 7th best in the world in its 2018 Inside the Ivory Tower annual report.

In 2009, a study carried out by researchers at the College of William and Mary found that the Elliott School had the 8th best terminal master's program in the world for those interested in policy careers in international affairs.

Foreign Policy ranks the Elliott School's doctoral programs as the 17th best in the world, out of 54 schools, in its 2018 Inside the Ivory Tower annual report.

QS World University Rankings lists the Elliott School in the "Politics & International Affairs" category as the 27th best school in the world, out of 201 schools.

The Elliott School's Master in International Affairs is ranked the 1st best in the United States in MastersStudies' Best Masters Programs in International Affairs in the United States 2018.

NPSIA is a member of the Association of Professional Schools of International Affairs (APSIA), a group of public policy, public administration and international affairs schools.

Research

As an integral part of its academic focus and mission, the Elliott School runs a large number of research institutes in a variety of issues. 
All are run by experts in their respective fields, who lead each institution's research initiatives, conferences, lectures, discussions and other activities.

The Elliott School is home to 10 research centers and institutes, that provide an institutional framework for scholars working in regional and topical fields of study, while more than 25 initiatives connect cross-curricular faculty and research to address critical global issues.

Centers and institutes, alongside research initiatives and projects, form Elliott School's scholarly and research arm, which seeks to advance understanding of important global issues and engaging the public and the policy community, both in the United States and internationally.

The Institute for International Economic Policy (IIEP) is one of the Elliott School's premier research institutes, collaborating with organizations like the World Bank Group and the International Monetary Fund frequently, which are both headquartered across the street from the Elliott School.

Adjunct professor Alistair Millar founded and runs the Global Center on Cooperative Security in Washington, as an initiative of the Fourth Freedom Forum.

Frank Ciluffo, Director of the GW Center for Cyber and Homeland Security, serves on its advisory board, which collaborates frequently with the Elliott School.

Publications
 International Affairs Review
 The Washington Quarterly

Centers and institutes
Institute for International Economic Policy
Institute for Public Diplomacy and Global Communication
Institute for Security and Conflict Studies
Institute for International Science and Technology Policy
Institute for Global and International Studies
Institute for Disaster and Fragility Resilience
Institute for European, Russian, and Eurasian Studies
Institute for Middle East Studies
Institute for African Studies
Institute for Korean Studies
Sigur Center for Asian Studies
Space Policy Institute

Research and policy programs
The Project on Forward Engagement
Brazil Initiative
China Policy Program
Culture in Global Affairs Program
Gender Equity in International Affairs Initiative
GW Diaspora Program
GW Cold War Group
Memory and Reconciliation in the Asia-Pacific
Partnership for International Strategies in Asia
Project on Humanitarian Governance
Rising Powers Initiative
Taiwan Education and Research Program
US-Japan Legislative Exchange Program

Notable people

Notable alumni
Many of the school's former students have gone on to distinguished careers in politics, diplomacy, and journalism, among numerous other fields. Some notable alumni include Kolinda Grabar-Kitarović (current President of Croatia), Chang Dae-whan (former Prime Minister of South Korea), Michael Punke (Vice President of Amazon Web Services and former U.S. Ambassador to the World Trade Organization), Admiral John B. Hayes (16th Commandant of the U.S. Cost Guard; MA '64), General John M. Shalikashvili (Supreme Allied Commander and Chairman of the Joint Chiefs of Staff; MA '70), Rose Gottemoeller (Deputy General of the NATO; MA '81), Ciarán Devane (Chief Executive of the British Council) Robert P. Jackson (U.S. Ambassador to Ghana and Cameroon), Kurt Volker (U.S. Ambassador to NATO; MA '87), David A. Nadler (vice-chairman of Marsh & McLennan Companies), K. T. McFarland (Deputy National Security Advisor; BA '73), Sam Johnson (U.S. Congressman from Texas; MS '74), Kasie Hunt (MSNBC and NBC News correspondent; BA '06), Reona Ito (The American Prize-winning orchestral conductor), and Diana B. Henriques (Pulitzer Prize finalist and The New York Times journalist; BA '69), among numerous others.

Notable faculty
Notable current faculty members include Amitai Etzioni (former president of the American Sociological Association), Thomas E. McNamara (former Assistant Secretary of State for Political-Military Affairs), Marc Lynch (Senior Fellow at the Center for a New American Security), Scott Pace (current Executive Secretary of the National Space Council), Charles Glaser (famed Defensive Realist theorist), David Shambaugh (Senior Fellow at the Brookings Institution), Lawrence Wilkerson (former Chief of Staff to United States Secretary of State Colin Powell), Michael N. Barnett (famed Constructivist theorist), James N Rosenau (former pres, Martha Finnemore (famed Constructivist theorist), Harry Harding (founding Dean of the Batten School of Leadership & Public Policy), Edward "Skip" Gnehm Jr. (former U.S. Ambassador to Jordan, Kuwait and Australia), James Foster (World Bank Board Advisor), Leon Fuerth (United States National Security Council member under President Bill Clinton), Eric Newsom (former Assistant Secretary of State for Political-Military Affairs), Stephen C. Smith (current Director of the Institute for International Economic Policy), Sabina Alkire (Director of the Oxford Poverty and Human Development Initiative), John Logsdon (former member of the NASA Advisory Council), and Nathan J. Brown (Board Advisor to the Project on Middle East Democracy). 

Notable past faculty have included Moudud Ahmed (former Prime Minister of Bangladesh), William Luers (former President of the Metropolitan Museum of Art), Joseph LeBaron (U.S. Ambassador to Qatar and Mauritania), William J. Crowe (former Chairman of the Joint Chiefs of Staff), Thomas J. Dodd Jr. (former U.S. Ambassador to Costa Rica & Uruguay), Christopher A. Kojm (former Chairman of the National Intelligence Council), S. M. Krishna (former Foreign Minister of India), and Andrew A. Michta (Adjunct Fellow at the Center for Strategic and International Studies)

See also
List of George Washington University alumni
List of George Washington University faculty

Notes

External links

Elliott School Alumni website
Elliott School Twitter profile
Elliott School Facebook page

 
Colleges and Schools of The George Washington University
Schools of international relations in the United States
Educational institutions established in 1898
1898 establishments in Washington, D.C.